This is an overview of the progression of the Olympic track cycling record of the men's flying 200 m time trial as recognised by the Union Cycliste Internationale (UCI).

The men's flying 200 m time trial is the qualification for the men's sprint. This discipline is competed since the first Olympics at the 1896 Summer Olympics, but in 1988 the flying 200 m time trial was introduced as a qualification event. The UCI lists the first Olympic record in 1992.

Progression
♦ denotes a performance that is also a current world record.  Statistics are correct as of the end of the 2016 Summer Olympics.

References

Track cycling Olympic record progressions